The Binant Series (Scenes of civilian and military life) (French - Suite Binant - Scènes de la vie civile et militaire) was a series of 36 large-format paintings commissioned by (and named after) Parisian art-material dealer Alfred Binant (1822-1904) in the wake of the Siege of Paris. 13 artists were involved, producing a precious record of the recent Franco-Prussian War and Paris Commune, first exhibited in 1872. Only thirteen of the full paintings survive, all of which are now in the Musée Carnavalet, though 36 modellos for the series were rediscovered in the stores of the Musée Gassendi in Digne-les-Bains in June 2017.

History 
 

 
 
 
In January 1871, Louis Alfred Binant, a Parisian dealer in paintings, artists' paper, crayons, paintings and other artists' materials with shops on rue de Cléry and boulevard Rochechouart (now boulevard Marguerite-de-Rochechouart), commissioned thirteen artists to produce 36 large-format oil on canvas paintings "certainly made two metres by four" to document the 1870-1871 siege of Paris. According to him, he also wanted "[to make] a work of memory, for neither books (however well-informed), nor engravings can speak to the eyes and therefore to the spirit as clearly as a painting". The paintings were exhibited from November 1871 to February 1872 at Durand-Ruel's dealership on rue Le Peletier, with the exhibition entitled Le Siège de Paris 1870-71. Exposition des peintures des épisodes civils et militaires de la défense. In September 1898, Binant bequeathed all 36 paintings and a booklet describing each painting to the city of Paris, though only thirteen still survive, all at the musée Carnavalet, which they officially entered in February 1914. The other works (now lost) remained in the stores of the Petit Palais, where they may have been destroyed during the German occupation (1940-1944). 

Sylvie Gonzalez, a curator at the musée d'Art et d'Histoire Paul Éluard in Saint-Denis, tried to find the lost works - in June 2017 the 36 modellos, each measuring 22 by 35 cm and produced as a preparatory sketch, were rediscovered in the stores of the musée Gassendi in Dignes-les-Bains. They had been acquired by that museum in 1900 from Binant and were restored by Nadine Gomez before in 2019 being placed in the musée d'art et d'histoire de Saint-Denis, which already had major holdings on the Commune.

Artists 
Most of the artists involved worked collaboratively on different paintings at the same time. The oldest of them, Jacques Guiaud, collaborated on 27 paintings and seems to have also been the most active.

 Georges Bellenger 
 Émile-Henri Brunner-Lacoste
 Auguste Carliez
 Eugène Carpezat
 Jules Didier
 Alfred Decaen
 Armand-Dumaresq
 Henri-Louis Dupray
 Henri Germain (1842-1898 ?)
 Jacques Guiaud
 Georges-François Guiaud fils (1840-1893 ?)
 Aubin Hervier (1851-1905 ?)
 Émile-Henri Laporte

List of paintings 
Before the modellos were rediscovered, all the paintings were known thanks to an album by Armand Dayot, entitled L’Invasion ; le Siège de 1870 d’après des peintures, gravures, photographies, sculptures, médailles autographes, objets du temps ; followed by La Commune 1871, published by Ernest Flammarion in 1902, which contained photographic reproductions.

 The Palais du corps législatif after its last sitting
 Ovation at the statue of the town of Strasbourg
 The Point-du-Jour Viaduct
 The banlieue inhabitants return to Paris
 The Prussian army marches on Paris
 Artillery encampment in the Tuileries Gardens
 M. Gambetta leaves in the "L'Armand-Barbès" balloon
 Battle at Châtillon, artillery offensive
 Attack on the village of Bagneux
 King Wilhelm at Versailles
 'Vegetable marauders returning to Paris
 Volunteers enlisting on place du Panthéon
 Battle at Rueil and La Malmaison
 The Belleville battalions break into the Hôtel-de-Ville
 The Queue at a grocer's doorway [Félix Potin]
 A session at the club Valentino
 Pigeon messengers
 Transcription of despatches at the central telegraph office
 The Bastion Quarante armed by the Joséphine
 Capture and occupation of the plateau d'Avron
 The press ambulances at Joinville-le-Pont
 The wounded from Champigny disembarked at quai de La Mégisserie
 The naval fusiliers at the Le Bourget attack
 Réunion du bataillons de marche sur la place du nouvel opéra
 A guard on the ramparts
 Inhabitants of the left bank fleeing bombardment
 Family taking refuge in a cave during bombardment
 The Pensionnat of the frères de Saint-Nicolas on rue de Vaugirard
 A municipal canteen
 A municipal butchers
 A woodyard burning
 Capture of the Montretout redoubt
 Mayor Drouot reading a despatch
 The Mazas prisoners freed by rioters
 Riot on 22 January, volley on place de l'Hôtel-de-Ville
 Bombardment of the fort de la Briche

References

Bibliography
 Hollis Clayson et Benoît Coutancier, Épisodes civils et militaires du siège de Paris 1870-1871. La suite Binant, Musée Gassendi (Digne-les-Bains) / Musée d’art et d’histoire Paul Éluard de Saint Denis, Illustria Librairie des Musées, 2019, 96 p. .

External links
  Le Siège de Paris, 1870-1871. Exposition de peinture des épisodes civils et militaires de la défense, livret de l'exposition chez Durand-Ruel — sur Gallica

Paintings of Paris
Painting series
Franco-Prussian War
Paris Commune
History paintings
French paintings
1870s paintings
Paintings in the collection of the Musée Carnavalet